Maria Lorts Sachs (born March 25, 1949) is a Democratic politician from Florida. She was a member of the Florida Senate from 2010 to 2016, representing parts of Broward and Palm Beach Counties. Previously, she served two terms in the Florida House of Representatives, representing part of southern Palm Beach County from 2006 until her election to the Senate. After her seat was redistricted in 2016, she opted not to seek reelection, and was hired as the executive director of Innovation Florida, a nonprofit advocacy organization.

History
Sachs was born in Battle Creek, Michigan and attended the University of Maryland, where she received her bachelor's degree, Boston University, where she received her master's degree, and, after she moved to Florida in 1976, the University of Miami, where she received her Juris Doctor. Following her graduation from law school, she worked as an assistant state attorney in the narcotics division in Miami-Dade County and in Broward County before working for Sachs and Sax, a civil law firm. In 1994, Sachs ran for the Group 25 judicial position on the Fifteenth Judicial Circuit Court of Florida, facing incumbent Judge Catherine M. Brunson, Curtis Levine, John Marinelli, and Brian Kimber. In the nonpartisan primary, Sachs received 21% of the vote and placed second to Brunson, who received 33%. Because Brunson did not win a majority, a runoff election was held. Sachs lost to Brunson, receiving 44% of the vote to Brunson's 56%.

Florida House of Representatives
When incumbent State Representative Anne M. Gannon opted to run for Palm Beach County Tax Collector rather than seek re-election in 2006, Sachs ran to succeed her in the 86th District, which stretched from Boca Raton to Boynton Beach in Palm Beach County. She faced Joseph Abruzzo, former New York State Assemblyman Mark Alan Siegel, and former Maine State Representative Harriet Lerman in the Democratic primary. Sachs received 34% of the vote to Abruzzo's 26%, Siegel's 21%, and Lerman's 19%, and advanced to the general election, where she was unopposed. Running for re-election in 2008, Sachs was opposed by independent candidate John Sottilare. She was endorsed for re-election by the Sun-Sentinel, which called her  a "promising" legislator who "has taken a smart approach to her job in Tallahassee" by passing good legislation. Sachs  won with 82% of the vote.

Florida Senate
When State Senator Ted Deutch was elected to Congress in a special election held in 2010, Sachs ran to succeed him in the 30th District, which included Boca Raton, Boynton Beach, Deerfield Beach, and Wellington in eastern Palm Beach County and northeastern Broward County. She was unopposed in both the Democratic primary and the general election and won her first term uncontested.

In 2012, when the state's legislative districts were redrawn in 2012, Sachs was moved into the 34th District, which contained much of the territory that she had previously represented. She faced fellow State Senator Ellyn Setnor Bogdanoff in the general election, and both the Florida Democratic Party and the Republican Party of Florida invested heavily in the race. Sachs was attacked in a television advertisement for allegedly billing limousine rides to taxpayers, a claim that Sachs disputed. Bogdanoff  raised more than a million dollars for her campaign, while Sachs raised about half of Bogdanoff's total. The Palm Beach Post endorsed Sachs over Bogdanoff, stating that her election could "head off reckless legislation the too-powerful Republican majority has been eager to pass" and stating that, in a number of instances, "Sachs cast a better vote." The Sun-Sentinel wrote that "either woman could do a credible job representing the district"  and  endorsed Bogdanoff, citing her ability to work with Republican leadership. Sachs won with 53% of the vote to Bogdanoff's 47%.

When Sachs ran for re-election in 2014, Bogdanoff challenged her in a rematch that would ultimately determine whether Republicans would win a supermajority in the State Senate or not. Sachs campaigned on her support for enhanced texting-while-driving laws and public education, while Bogdanoff expressed her support for prison reform and charter schools. Unlike two years prior, the Republican Party did not advertise on Bogdanoff's behalf, and though Bogdanoff outraised Sachs once again, it was by a considerably smaller advantage than two years prior. Sachs was attacked by groups supporting Bogdanoff for the fact that she owned a large home outside the district, though she stated that she lives within the district full-time. The Sun-Sentinel, which had endorsed Bogdanoff in 2012, endorsed Sachs in their rematch, stating that she was a "capable legislator in a body dominated by Republicans," and that voters "have no need to make a change." Sachs defeated Bogdanoff,  52 to 48%.

After court-ordered redistricting redrew once again redrew her senate district, Sachs decided not to seek reelection in 2016. She was hired as the executive director of Innovation Florida, a nonprofit advocacy organization that she helped found.

References

External links
Florida House of Representatives - Maria Sachs
Sachs for Senate

|-

|-

|-

Democratic Party members of the Florida House of Representatives
Democratic Party Florida state senators
1949 births
Living people
University of Maryland, College Park alumni
Boston University alumni
University of Miami School of Law alumni
People from Delray Beach, Florida
Florida lawyers
Women state legislators in Florida
People from Battle Creek, Michigan
21st-century American women